The Luxembourg national football team (nicknamed the Red Lions; ,) is the national football team of Luxembourg, and is controlled by the Luxembourg Football Federation. The team plays most of its home matches at the Stade de Luxembourg in Luxembourg City.

Luxembourg has participated in every FIFA World Cup qualifiers since those for the 1934 World Cup and in UEFA European Championship qualifiers since those for Euro 1964. As of 2020, they have never qualified for any of these major tournaments. Luxembourg is the nation with the most qualifying campaigns in both of these competitions without ever making it to the finals. However, they did compete in six Olympic football events between 1920 and 1952.

History

Luxembourg played their first ever international match on 29 October 1911, in a friendly match against France; it resulted in a 1–4 defeat. Their first victory came on 8 February 1914, also in a match against France, which they won 5–4.

The national side of Luxembourg competed in six Olympic football events between 1920 and 1952, and survived the preliminary round twice (in 1948 and 1952). In between, Luxembourg started participating at qualifiers for the FIFA World Cup, but as of 2018 they still never qualified.

Starting in 1921, the Luxembourg national A-selection would play 239 unofficial international matches until 1981, mostly against other countries' B-teams like those of Belgium, France, Switzerland and West Germany, as well as a team representing South-Netherlands.

After their last Olympic tournament in 1952, the national team also started playing in qualifying groups for UEFA European Championships, but could not reach the major European tournament end stages. The only time that the team was close to qualify was for a European or World Championship was for the Euro 1964. In the first qualification round they defeated the Netherlands with a score of 3–2 on aggregate after two matches. A Dutch newspaper commented this stunt after the second match with "David Luxembourg won with 2–1 [against Goliath Netherlands]". In the round of eight, Luxembourg and Denmark fought for a spot in the final tournament. The winner was decided after three matches; Denmark was the winner with a total aggregate score of 6–5.

When the national team does win a competitive match, they are often celebrated by national media and fans, as was the case after a 2–1 win against Switzerland in 2008.

On 3 September 2017, Luxembourg held France to a 0–0 draw at Stadium Municipal in Toulouse, France. It was the first time France had failed to win against Luxembourg since 1914, when Luxembourg won, 5–4. On 10 November 2017, Luxembourg pulled off an upset by defeating Hungary 2–1 in a friendly.
On 28 March 2021, Luxembourg beat the Republic of Ireland in a 2022 FIFA World Cup qualification match with a goal from Gerson Rodrigues in the 85th minute.

Kit
Traditionally, the badge on Luxembourg's team outfit displays a shield very similar to Luxembourg's lesser coat of arms, a red lion on a white-blue striped background – hence the team's nickname Red Lions. In modern times, the team played home games in entirely red strips, in accordance with their nickname, and wore white as away colour.

Home stadium
As of 1 September 2021, the Luxembourg national team adopted Luxembourg City's, Stade de Luxembourg the country's national stadium, as its home venue. Formerly, the team played at the Stade Josy Barthel, where, at counting in August 2015, it had played 235 games, including unofficial matches. It is also used for rugby union and athletics.

Results and forthcoming fixtures

As of 20 November 2022 after the match against Bulgaria, the Luxembourg national team playing record is as follows:

Recent results and fixtures are as follows:

2022

2023

Current staff

The crew that guides the Luxembourg national team includes following members:

Coaching history
The following managers have been in charge of Luxembourg's national squad:

 Paul Feierstein (1933–1948)
 Jean-Pierre Hoscheid, Jules Müller & Albert Reuter (1948–1949)
 Adolf Patek (1949–1953)
 Béla Volentik (1953–1955)
 Eduard Havlicek (1955)
 Nándor Lengyel (1955–1959)
 Pierre Sinibaldi (1959–1960)
 Robert Heinz (1960–1969)
 Ernst Melchior (1969–1972)
 Gilbert Legrand (1972–1977)
 Arthur Schoos (1978)
 Louis Pilot (1978–1984)
 Jozef Vliers (1984)
 Josy Kirchens (1985)
 Paul Philipp (1985–2001)
 Allan Simonsen (2001–2004)
 Guy Hellers (2004–2010)
 Luc Holtz (2010–present)

Players

In 2004, the Luxembourg Football Federation selected Louis Pilot as their Golden Player, Luxembourg's greatest player of the past 50 years.

Current squad
The following players were called up for the UEFA Euro 2024 qualifying matches against Slovakia on 23 March 2023 and Portugal on 26 March 2023.

Caps and goals as of 20 November 2022 after the match against Bulgaria.

Recent call-ups
The following players have also been called up to the Luxembourg squad during last 12 months and are still eligible for selection.

RET Player retired from the national team.

Player records

Players in bold are still active with Luxembourg.

Most capped players

Top goalscorers

Competitive record

FIFA World Cup

UEFA European Championship

UEFA Nations League

Olympic Games

Head to head record
As of 20 November 2022 after the match against Bulgaria.

Footnotes

See also

Luxembourg men's national under-21 football team
Luxembourg men's national under-19 football team
Luxembourg men's national under-17 football team
Luxembourg women's national football team

References

External links

Luxembourg's football federation website
Luxembourg FIFA profile
RSSSF archive of results 1911–
RSSSF archive of results from unofficial games 1921–

 
European national association football teams
National team
1911 establishments in Luxembourg